The 2019 SMU Mustangs football team represented Southern Methodist University during the 2019 NCAA Division I FBS football season. The Mustangs were led by second-year head coach Sonny Dykes and played their home games at Gerald J. Ford Stadium in University Park, Texas, a separate city within the city limits of Dallas. They competed as members of the West Division of the American Athletic Conference.

The Mustangs started the season 8–0, their first 8–0 start to a season since 1982. The team's non-conference schedule was capped off with a 41–38 victory over rival TCU, their first victory over the Horned Frogs since 2011. Following a 48–21 victory over the South Florida Bulls in week 5, the Mustangs entered the AP Poll at no. 24, their first poll ranking since the team received the NCAA's death penalty in February 1987. The team's first loss of the season would come on November 2 against the Memphis Tigers. The team went on to play in the Boca Raton Bowl, falling to Florida Atlantic.

Previous season
The Mustangs finished the 2018 season 5–7, 4–4 in The American play to finish in fourth place. The Mustangs were ineligible for postseason play and thus were not invited to any bowl game.

Preseason

Recruiting class
References:

|}

Award watch lists
Listed in the order that they were released

References:

AAC media poll
The AAC media poll was released on July 16, 2019, with the Mustangs predicted to finish fourth in the AAC West Division.

Preseason All-AAC teams
SMU placed nine players to the All-AAC team, sanctioned by Athlon Sports.

Offense

1st team

James Proche – Sr, wide receiver

3rd team

Reggie Roberson Jr. – Jr, wide receiver

4th team

Shane Buechele – Jr, quarterback
Xavier Jones – Sr, running back
Hayden howerton – Jr, center

Defensive

2nd team

Delontae Scott – Sr, defensive lineman
Richard moore – Sr, linebacker
Rodney clemons – Sr, safety

Special teams

4th team

James proche – Sr, punt returner

Schedule
SMU's 2019 schedule will begin with four non-conference games: first on the road against Arkansas State of the Sun Belt Conference, then at home against North Texas of Conference USA, then at home against Texas State, also of the Sun Belt Conference, and finally on the road against cross-town rival TCU of the Big 12 Conference. In American Athletic Conference play, the Mustangs will play the other members of the West Division and draw East Carolina, South Florida, and Temple from the East Division. They will not play Cincinnati, Connecticut, or UCF as part of the regular season.

Source:

Roster

Game summaries

at Arkansas State

North Texas

Texas State

With the victory, the Mustangs improved to 3–0, their first 3–0 start since the 1984 season.

at TCU

The Mustangs built a 15–0 lead in the 1st quarter and never trailed in the game. SMU lead 31–17 at halftime, but the Horned Frogs rallied in the 2nd half to trail by 3 points late in the 4th. The Mustangs held on and stopped the comeback attempt, winning 41–38. This is SMU's first win over TCU since 2011.

at South Florida

Tulsa

Temple

at Houston

at Memphis

Memphis hosted the Mustangs in the first-ever College GameDay appearance for the Tigers, and just the second for SMU. The Mustangs jumped out to an early lead in front of the sold-out crowd, and the two teams traded scores to reach halftime with a 17-23 score in favor of Memphis. The Tigers never trailed in the second half, although the Mustangs drew within one score on a Shane Buechele pass to James Proche and Jaylon Thomas's two-point conversion late in the fourth quarter. Memphis handed SMU its first loss of the season.

East Carolina

at Navy

Tulane

at Florida Atlantic (Boca Raton Bowl)

Statistics

Scoring
Scores against non-conference opponents

Scores against the AAC

Scores against all opponents

Rankings

Postseason

All-American Athletic Conference Football Team

Offense

1st team
James Proche – Sr, Wide Receiver
Shane Buechele – Jr, Quarterback
Xavier Jones – Sr, Running Back

2nd team
Jaylon thomas – SO, Offensive Tackle
Kylen Granson – Jr, Tight End

Defensive

1st team
Patrick nelson – Sr, Linebacker

2nd team
Delontae Scott – Sr, Defensive Lineman
Rodney clemons – Sr, Safety

Special teams

2nd team
C. J. Sanders – Sr, Return Specialist

References:

Players drafted into the NFL

References

SMU
SMU Mustangs football seasons
SMU Mustangs football